Namacus is a genus of leaf-footed bugs in the family Coreidae. There are at least four described species in Namacus.

Species
These four species belong to the genus Namacus:
 Namacus annulicornis Stål, 1870
 Namacus nympha Distant, 1913
 Namacus prominulus (Stål, 1860)
 Namacus transvirgatus Amyot & Serville, 1843

References

Further reading

External links

Articles created by Qbugbot
Coreini
Coreidae genera